A local volatility model, in mathematical finance and financial engineering, is an option pricing model that treats volatility as a function of both the current asset level  and of time .

Formulation
In mathematical finance, the asset St that underlies a financial derivative is typically assumed to follow a stochastic differential equation of the form 
,
The amplitude of this randomness is measured by the instant volatility . In the simplest model i.e. the Black–Scholes model,  is assumed to be constant; in reality, the realised volatility of an underlying actually varies with time.

When such volatility has a randomness of its own—often described by a different equation driven by a different W—the model above is called a stochastic volatility model. And when such volatility is merely a function of the current asset level St and of time t, we have a local volatility model. The local volatility model is a useful simplification of the stochastic volatility model.

"Local volatility" is thus a term used in quantitative finance to denote the set of diffusion coefficients, that are consistent with market prices for all options on a given underlying. This model is used to calculate exotic option valuations which are consistent with observed prices of vanilla options.

Development
The concept of a local volatility was developed when Bruno Dupire  and Emanuel Derman and Iraj Kani 
noted that there is a unique diffusion process consistent with the risk neutral densities derived from the market prices of European options.

Derman and Kani described and implemented a local volatility function to model instantaneous volatility. They used this function at each node in a binomial options pricing model. The tree successfully produced option valuations consistent with all market prices across strikes and expirations. The Derman-Kani model was thus formulated with discrete time and stock-price steps. (Derman and Kani produced what is called an "implied binomial tree"; with Neil Chriss they extended this to an implied trinomial tree.  The implied binomial tree fitting process was numerically unstable.)

The key continuous-time equations used in local volatility models were developed by Bruno Dupire in 1994.  Dupire's equation states

In order to compute the partial derivatives, there exist few known parameterizations of the implied volatility surface based on the Heston model: Schönbucher, SVI and gSVI. Other techniques include mixture of lognormal distribution and stochastic collocation.

Derivation

Given the price of the asset  governed by the risk neutral SDE

The transition probability  conditional to  satisfies the forward Kolmogorov equation (also known as Fokker–Planck equation)
 

Because of the Martingale pricing theorem, the price of a call option with maturity  and strike  is

Differentiating the price of a call option with respect to 

and replacing in the formula for the price of a call option and rearranging terms

Differentiating the price of a call option with respect to  twice

Differentiating the price of a call option with respect to  yields

using the Forward Kolmogorov equation

integrating by parts the first integral once and the second integral twice

using the formulas derived differentiating the price of a call option with respect to

Use
Local volatility models are useful in any options market in which the underlying's volatility is predominantly a function of the level of the underlying, interest-rate derivatives for example. Time-invariant local volatilities are supposedly inconsistent with the dynamics of the equity index implied volatility surface, but see , who claims that such models provide the best average hedge for equity index options. Local volatility models are nonetheless useful in the formulation of stochastic volatility models.

Local volatility models have a number of attractive features.  Because the only source of randomness is the stock price, local volatility models are easy to calibrate. Numerous calibration methods are developed to deal with the McKean-Vlasov processes including the most used particle and bin approach. Also, they lead to complete markets where hedging can be based only on the underlying asset. The general non-parametric approach by Dupire is however problematic, as one needs to arbitrarily pre-interpolate the input implied volatility surface before applying the method. Alternative parametric approaches have been proposed, notably the highly tractable mixture dynamical local volatility models by Damiano Brigo and Fabio Mercurio.

Since in local volatility models the volatility is a deterministic function of the random stock price, local volatility models are not very well used to price cliquet options or forward start options, whose values depend specifically on the random nature of volatility itself.

References

Derivatives (finance)